Hon Chio Leong (born 12 September 2001), also known as Charles Leong, is a racing driver from Macau. He is the only local driver to win the Macau Grand Prix twice, albeit in Formula 4 machinery.  He currently competes in the China Formula 4 Championship as a guest driver, having previously competed in the FIA Formula 3 European Championship.

He has participated in his home race four times, winning both the COVID-impacted 2020 edition and 2021 edition for Formula 4 machinery.

Charles Leong prepared for the 2021 Macau Grand Prix by competing as a guest driver in four FIA F4 China Championship races at the Zhuhai International Circuit held from 24 to 25 October. Leong won all four races.

Racing record

Career summary

† As Leong was a guest driver, he was ineligible for points.

*Season still in progress.

Complete F3 Asian Championship results
(key) (Races in bold indicate pole position) (Races in italics indicate fastest lap)

Complete FIA Formula 3 European Championship results
(key) (Races in bold indicate pole position) (Races in italics indicate fastest lap)

Complete Macau Grand Prix results

Complete FIA Formula 3 Championship results
(key) (Races in bold indicate pole position; races in italics indicate points for the fastest lap of top ten finishers)

References

External links
Profile at Driver Database

Macau racing drivers
2001 births
Living people
Formula Masters China drivers
FIA Formula 3 European Championship drivers
FIA Formula 3 Championship drivers
F3 Asian Championship drivers

Asian Formula Renault Challenge drivers
Asia Racing Team drivers
Hitech Grand Prix drivers
Jenzer Motorsport drivers
Chinese F4 Championship drivers
BlackArts Racing drivers